"You Trip Me Up" is a song by the Scottish alternative rock band The Jesus and Mary Chain from their 1985 debut album Psychocandy. The track was released as the second single from the record through Blanco y Negro Records in May 1985. The song was written by band members William Reid and Jim Reid.

It was one of the first four songs by the band that were recorded for a Peel Session.

A music video for the song was recorded in Algarve, Portugal.

Critical reception 
The song was ranked number 6 among the "Tracks of the Year" for 1985 by NME.

Chart performance
The single reached number 55 on the UK Singles Chart.

Track listing
All tracks written by Jim Reid and William Reid.

7" (NEG 13)
"You Trip Me Up" – 2:22
"Just Out of Reach" – 3:04

12" (NEG 13T)
"You Trip Me Up" – 2:22
"Just Out of Reach" – 3:04
"Boyfriend's Dead" – 1:36

Personnel

The Jesus and Mary Chain
Jim Reid – vocals, producer
William Reid – guitar, producer
Douglas Hart – bass, producer
Bobby Gillespie – drums, producer

Additional personnel
John Loder – engineer

References

External links
Lyrics at MTV.com

The Jesus and Mary Chain songs
1985 singles
Songs written by Jim Reid
Songs written by William Reid (musician)
1985 songs
Blanco y Negro Records singles